Finn-men, also known as, Muckle men, Fion and Fin Finn, were Inuit sighted around the north of Scotland.

Sightings
The first recorded sighting was in Orkney, in 1682. James Wallace, writing in about 1688, described a Finn-man in his "little Boat" at the south end of Eday being seen by the people of the island from the shore, and then fleeing swiftly when the islanders put out a boat to try and apprehend him. In 1684, a Finn-man seen at Westray was connected with the disappearance of fish from the area. A boat was captured in Orkney, and sent to the Physicians Hall in Edinburgh.

Origins
They were originally associated with Finland, although they were in fact Inuit from the Davis Straits, a fact recognised by Wallace. It was considered more probable that they could have travelled from Finland or Lapland within Europe, possibly due to the sound of their language, so the association persisted.

Wallace's eldest son James added a note to a 1700 publication of his father's account, suggesting they had been driven to Scotland by storms. The most likely reason for their arrival is that they were escaped prisoners, having been taken by European ships as curiosities. Such was the concern about this practice that in 1720 the Staten Generaal of the Netherlands passed a law prohibiting the murder or kidnapping of Inuit.

Description
John Brand, in A Brief Description of Orkney, described a sighting of a Finn-man.

Artefacts
Kayaks belonging to Finn-men are preserved in Edinburgh and Aberdeen.

Mythology
The Finn-men were grafted onto the existing mythologies that surrounded the selkies and Finfolk, to the point that both creatures may have both been the same in folklore. Their appearance was interpreted in terms of those traditions.

Related media 
The history of the Finnmen is discussed in the Red Bull TV series Explorers in the episode  "Journey of the Finnmen".

References

Citations

Sources
 
 
 Rogers, Norman (2012). Searching for the finmen : an unplanned journey in homage to the kayak and its Inuit masters. Leicester : Matador. 

History of Orkney
Inuit history
17th century in Scotland
Scottish mythology